Keisuke Hoashi (born September 14, 1967) is an American stage, film and television actor, playwright, screenwriter and film producer of Japanese descent.

Background
Hoashi attended Stuyvesant High School in New York City, including three summers (1982–85) at the New York State Music Camp, before attending the Crane School of Music. He retired from music at 20, and became an alumnus of Troy, New York's Rensselaer Polytechnic Institute, receiving his M.A. in 1993 in technical communication with a graphics certificate. He then moved to Los Angeles and became the NCR Corporation's first multimedia designer. He left NCR in 1998 to become a full-time actor.  In 2005 he returned to Oneonta, New York as musical theatre instructor for the Hartwick College Summer Music Festival.

Career

Theater
In 1993, he was cast as a bumbling Japanese businessman in a college production of  Anything Goes.  In 1998, Hoashi starred in the lead role of Onizuka in Onizuka, Kona's Son, an unsuccessful musical play about U.S. astronauts.  In 2000, Hoashi created the world's first martial arts musical comedy play, "Memoirs of a Ninja",  for which he won five Maddy Awards, five Garland Award nominations, and was honored as being among "The Best of Theatre 2000" by NiteLife After Dark magazine.  He earned another Maddy Award for his portrayal of "Sakini" in "The Teahouse of the August Moon" for FireRose Productions.

Television and film
Hoashi's television appearances include Glee, Mad Men, iCarly: iGo to Japan, The King of Queens, Bob's Burgers and Hawthorne. He played a Japanese reporter in the film The Princess Diaries 2.  In 2006 he wrote, produced, and starred in the television movie Cooking Kids.

Music camp
In 2006, he co-founded the New York Summer Music Festival music camp in Oneonta, New York, and is current director of communications and media, head of the camp's writing & acting program, and resident actor.  His narration was featured at the 2010 New York Summer Music Festival's "The Lady Is a Song" concert, starring Ann Hampton Callaway.

Filmography

Television
 Frank Leaves for the Orient (1 episode, 1999) as Zen-O-Phonics Man
 The Amanda Show (1 episode, 2000) as Sailer
 Strong Medicine (1 episode, 2001) as Hematologist
 Sabrina, the Teenage Witch (1 episode, 2001) as Delivery Man
 The Man Show (1 episode, 2001) as Crack Spackle Man
 The District (1 episode, 2002) as  Dr. Becktel
 America's Most Wanted: America Fights Back (1 episode, 2002) as Boyfriend
 The Bernie Mac Show (1 episode, 2003) as Soccer Dad
 Coupling (1 episode) as Sushi Chef
 Yes, Dear (1 episode, 2003) as Bob
 Dr. Vegas (1 episode, 2004) as Patron
 Boston Legal (1 episode, 2005) as Police Technician
 The King of Queens (1 episode, 2005) as Phil Matsumoto
 How I Met Your Mother (1 episode, 2005) as Doctor
 Jake in Progress (1 episode, 2006) as Doctor
 The Suite Life of Zack & Cody (1 episode, 2006) as Singing Pizza Waiter
 Cooking Kids (2006) as Chef
 Drake & Josh (1 episode, 2006) as Hospital Administrator
 Them (2007) as Detective
 The Singles Table (1 episode, 2007) as ER Doctor
 Las Vegas (1 episode, 2007) as Alan Marshall
 The Wedding Bells (1 episode, 2007) as Studio Technician
 Viva Laughlin (1 episode, 2007) as Felix Wang
 Notes from the Underbelly (1 episode, 2007) as Home Sushi Chef
 iCarly: iGo to Japan (2008) as Security Chief
 Rita Rocks (1 episode, 2008) as Court Baliff
 Castle (1 episode, 2009) as Mr. Lee
 Hawthorne (2 episodes, 2009) as Dr. Mazaki
 Entourage (1 episode, 2009) as Club Official
 Better Off Ted (1 episode, 2009) as Scientist
 Monk (1 episode, 2009) as First Cop
 Heroes (2 episodes, 2010) as Japanese Cop
 Parenthood (1 episode, 2010) as Arnold Lee
 Glee (1 episode, 2010) as Peter 'Chainsaw' Gow
 The Young and the Restless (1 episode, 2010) as  Mr. Yunioshi
 Mad Men (1 episode, 2010) as Hachi Saito
 Bob's Burgers (2 episodes, 2015 - 2019) as Shinji Kojima

Film
 Love, Ltd. (2000) as Mr. Lee
 Zombie Rights! (2003) as Dr. Zombie
 The Matrices (2003) as The Director
 The Princess Diaries 2: Royal Engagement (2004) as Japanese Reporter
 Dating Games People Play (2005) as Japanese man
 Grasshopper (2006) as Bartender
 Target Audience 9.1 (2007) as Dr. K
 The Poughkeepsie Tapes (2007) as Dai Loung
 Half-Life (2008) as Field Reporter
 Eggbaby (2009) as Mr. Chin
 Love & Distrust (2010) as Bartender
 Adultolescence (2010) as Tim Chen

Video games
 Ghost of Tsushima (2020) as Ippei the Monk
 Cyberpunk 2077 (2020) as Angel/various

Recognition
Of Hoashi's performance in Anything Goes, the Daily Gazette claimed he was miscast, writing "Even when apparently seasick or drunk, Hoashi came across as intelligent and competent, not a befuddled, confused non-English-speaking Asian."

Of his original play, "Memoirs of a Ninja", NiteLite After Dark praised the production, writing "Hoashi's quirky lyrics and twirled-about concepts are a clever mix of fun, frolic and belly laughs with political, social, moral, ethical, and cynical commentary that hilariously sideswipe political correctness, stereotypes, traditional thinking, racism, sexism, ageism and every other 'ism' in between."

References

External links
 
 
 

1967 births
Living people
Rensselaer Polytechnic Institute alumni
Crane School of Music alumni
American male dramatists and playwrights
American dramatists and playwrights of Japanese descent
American film producers
American male screenwriters
American male actors of Japanese descent
American male film actors
American male stage actors
American male television actors
20th-century American male actors
21st-century American male actors
American film actors of Asian descent